The 2003 State Farm Women's Tennis Classic was a women's tennis tournament played on outdoor hard courts in Scottsdale, Arizona, United States that was part of the Tier II category of the 2003 WTA Tour. It was the fourth and last edition of the tournament and ran from February 25 through March 2, 2003. Unseeded Ai Sugiyama won the singles title and earned $93,000 first-prize money.

Finals

Singles

 Ai Sugiyama defeated  Kim Clijsters 3–6, 7–5, 6–4
 It was Sugiyama' 1st singles title of the year and the 4th of her career.

Doubles

 Kim Clijsters /  Ai Sugiyama defeated  Lindsay Davenport /  Lisa Raymond 6–1, 6–4

References

External links
 ITF tournament edition details
 Tournament draws

State Farm Women's Tennis Classic
State Farm Women's Tennis Classic
2003 in American tennis
2003 in sports in Arizona